The 1967 All-Big Eight Conference football team consists of American football players chosen by various organizations for All-Big Eight Conference teams for the 1967 NCAA University Division football season.  The selectors for the 1967 season included the Associated Press (AP).

Offensive selections

Ends
 Dave Jones, Kansas State (AP)
 Dennis Richnafsky, Nebraska (AP)

Tackles
 Bob Kalsu, Oklahoma,  (AP)
 Mike Montler, Colorado (AP)
 Russ Washington, Missouri (AP)

Guards
 Kirk Tracy, Colorado (AP)
 John Greene, Kansas (AP)

Centers
 John Kolb, Oklahoma State (AP)

Backs
 Bobby Douglass, Kansas (AP)
 Bob Warmack, Oklahoma (AP)
 Steve Owens, Oklahoma (AP)
 Dick Davis, Nebraska (AP)

Defensive selections

Defensive ends
 John Zook, Kansas (AP)
 Mike Schnitker, Colorado (AP)

Defensive tackles
 Granville Liggins, Oklahoma (AP)
 Jim McCord, Nebraska (AP)

Middle guards
 Wayne Meylan, Nebraska (AP)

Linebackers
 John Douglas, Missouri (AP)
 Denny Lankas, Kansas State (AP)
 Mike Sweatman, Kansas (AP)

Defensive backs
 Dick Anderson, Colorado (AP)
 Harry Cheatwood, Oklahoma State (AP)
 Roger Wehrli, Missouri (AP)

Key
AP = Associated Press

See also
 1967 College Football All-America Team

References

All-Big Seven Conference football team
All-Big Eight Conference football teams